The 1996 Hawaii Rainbow Warriors football team represented the University of Hawaiʻi at Mānoa in the Western Athletic Conference during the 1996 NCAA Division I-A football season. In their first season under head coach Fred von Appen, the Rainbow Warriors compiled a 2–10 record.

Schedule

References

Hawaii
Hawaii Rainbow Warriors football seasons
Hawaii Rainbow Warriors football